was a Japanese samurai of the Sengoku period through the Azuchi-Momoyama Period. He was born in 1558 to a father who was said to be a retainer of either Ōtomo Sōrin or Rokkaku Yoshikata. He became one of Toyotomi Hideyoshi's followers. He participated in the Toyotomi's Odawara campaign and Korean campaign.

Biography
Ōtani Yoshitsugu is well known in Japan for two main aspects: his leprosy, and his friendship with Ishida Mitsunari. Supposedly he was one who put friendship before anything (although obviously such a subjective matter is hard to determine), and it may have been in Korea campaign that Ishida and Ōtani, working together, formed their legendary friendship. There is even an anecdote concerning this friendship: once in a secret tea party, and all those invited were passing around a cup of tea. As Ōtani Yoshitsugu took a sip, some pus from his face dropped into the cup. Yoshitsugu discovered this, but too late: the cup was already being passed around. The people who took sips after this all had horrified expressions on their faces, but when it came to Mitsunari's turn, he calmly drank all the remaining tea, pus and all.

In the event that Yoshitsugu was born under Yoshifusa, there is a popular story regarding the origin of his childhood name, Keimatsu (桂松 or 慶松). Before his son was born, Yoshifusa lamented his luck with children and wished for a male heir. One day, his wife decided to pray before a shrine dedicated to Hachiman Daibosetsu in their land. As she uttered her desires for a boy, a pine tree was cut before the shrine and fell before her. She plucked a portion of the fallen branches and ate it for good luck. When she gave birth, Yoshifusa was happy to see his first son. Grateful for the god's answer, he named his child after the plant.

His first legal alias was Heima (平馬), which was given to him during his early services with Hideyoshi. He was either given this name for his leadership of the cavalry at Harima or in recognition of his service at Siege of Miki. A few years later, temple printings associate him with having the alias Kinosuke or Norinosuke (紀之介). He has also been argued to have had his name changed to Ōtani Gyōbu (大谷刑部). Gyōbu reportedly was given as a respectful link to the Genji family or in honor of Yoshitsugu's higher rank at the time.

When Yoshitsugu fell ill with leprosy, he was popularly described to have looked dreadfully pale, which led to his nickname "White Face" (白頭). Legends state the name may have been also caused since he covered his face with a white mask, a typical attire when stricken with the disease.

Before the Battle of Sekigahara, Yoshitsugu was said to have repeatedly tried to persuade Mitsunari of the futility of his actions. However, at seeing the staunchness of his friend's convictions, Yoshitsugu joined his cause after mulling it over for several days. At the time, Yoshitsugu's health was deteriorating, making him nearly blind. He could not stand up, let alone fight. He was led to the battleground in a palanquin.

Yoshitsugu was at the head of about 600 men, with another 4000 or so under Toda Shigemasa, Hiratsuka Tamehiro, Ōtani Yoshikatsu (his son), and Kinoshita Yoritsugu. As the battle raged on, Kobayakawa Hideaki, who was situated above Yoshitsugu on Mount Matsuo, didn't move, despite repeated calls from Ishida Mitsunari. Yoshitsugu suspected something, and thus called for his troops to position themselves so as to prepare for a possible attack from their flanks. His hunch was right, as following a stimulatory gun volley from Ieyasu's position, Kobayakawa Hideaki and his troops rushed down the mountain towards Yoshitsugu's position. This movement was immediately followed by Akaza Naoyasu, Ogawa Suketada, Kutsuki Mototsuna, and Wakizaka Yasuharu, a total of over 20,000 troops.

Yoshitsugu's troops fought back, at one point even driving back Kobayakawa's troops partway up the mountain, but in the end, sheer numbers took their toll. While this was happening, Yoshitsugu, unable to see, repeatedly asked one of his retainers, Yuasa Gosuke, "Is it lost?" When the latter finally answered in the affirmative, Yoshitsugu asked him to cut his head off. He was then beheaded by his retainer, who also committed seppuku.

Yoshitsugu and Mitsunari
Ōtani Yoshitsugu has been romanticized in poetry and fiction as Ishida Mitsunari's heroic and talented friend since the Edo Period. It is said they have been good friends since their early days working with Toyotomi Hideyoshi, each respecting the others' judgment and character. A particularly famous episode between them occurred during a tea ceremony at Osaka Castle in 1587. An ill Yoshitsugu drank from the tea bowl traditionally passed among the attendees but left an embarrassing spot of pus after his mouthful. Keeping true to the ceremony, he was forced to pass it on to others. The attendees shied away from their traditional gulp and respectfully moved it along the line. When it came to Mitsunari, he drank the entire contents without faltering and commented that the tea was superbly delicious. Yoshitsugu was touched by his friend's gesture, commonly said to have led to his determination to fight for the Western army. There is also a legend of the two being romantically involved with one another due to their close ties, sometimes argued to have started due to this event.

While the tea ceremony incident was recorded by people actually alive during the time period (Kamiya Sōtan and Tsuda Sōgyū being among them), the subject of their actual friendship is under speculation. To be more precise, Yoshitsugu himself is put under eye of skepticism. Stories from the Edo Period will appraise Yoshitsugu as an honorable and talented retainer since his youth, but nothing in historical records offers details to support their claims. His father is said to either have been Ōtani Yoshifusa (retainer to Hideyoshi) or Ōtani Moriharu (a vassal of the Ōtomo family) since they both shared the same family name. Both men are of unknown origin and have little recorded for them beside a few notes and their names. It is often said that he was born in Ōmi Province; his mother was one of Kōdai-In's maids and was how Yoshitsugu became favored by Hideyoshi. However, if one is to believe his father was Moriharu, this defenestrates the story entirely since Yoshitsugu was also said to have only joined Hideyoshi after departing from the Ōtomo family in his late twenties. Since little is known about either Ōtani clans to completely verify the stories, Yoshitsugu's first meeting with the Taikō is a mystery.

The unknown sections of his life create a twenty- or thirty-year gap often filled with stories and rumors. Among those put into question is his bonds with Mitsunari, since legends will proclaim they knew each other since they were serving under Hideyoshi in their youth. His age is at odds with the tales created for their relationship—romanticized to have occurred due to their close ages—and adds more mystery to Yoshitsugu. The contradictions have been so confusing that a rather radical theory has been emerging with a small portion of believers for their friendship. This story argues Yoshitsugu had died of his illness within a year of contracting it and that the Yoshitsugu at Sekigahara was actually a heavily ailed Hideyoshi in disguise. While an interesting concept, it needs to prove Hideyoshi had somehow survived his historically accepted death date and adds more fuel to the debate. In any case, speculation over whether the two men truly considered one another friends continues to this day.

He is not known to have had an official wife, but he supposedly fathered three sons and one daughter. His second son died with him at Sekigahara while his other two argued male offspring either fell with the Toyotomi family at Osaka Castle or lived past the wars in seclusion. Yoshitsugu's daughter, Chikurin-in was a wife of Sanada Yukimura and mother of his two heirs: Sanada Daisuke (Yukimasa) and Sanada Daihachi (Morinobu). A purposed folktale states Yoshitsugu had one concubine prior to Sekigahara, who went insane with grief after his death.

Service under Hideyoshi
Coming from unknown beginnings. Under Hideyoshi, Yoshitsugu become kōshō, who took charge of secretarial affairs, in particular acting as a human shield to protect their lord at the risk of losing their own lives (for this reason, Kosho had to not only be knowledgeable and have impeccable manners, but also be skilled in the military arts). 

Yoshitsugu could have entered Hideyoshi's services as a low rank kōshō or became Mitsunari's yoriki in the mid or late 1570s (either in his mid teens or mid-late twenties). Several stories will state that his intellect and charm had earned him many friends, but the legitimacy of the claims are still debated. His early achievements with the Hashiba family are not known, but most sources argue that he was among the 700 or so named individuals who sided with Hideyoshi after the Incident at Honnōji. He joined Katō Toranosuke, Fukushima Ichimatsu and other kōshō to take Nagahama Castle away from Shibata Katsutoyo, Shibata Katsuie's nephew. Hideyoshi has been romanticized to have said the following for Yoshitsugu at this time, "Give me a million troops and I would love to see him guide them."

Once the Battle of Shizugatake commenced, Yoshitsugu was said to have taken part within the Toyotomi ranks. What he did—if anything—is scattered among legends and folklore. One account states that he was the one who used his wits to convince Katsutoyo to surrender prior to the battle. Yet another tale depicts him as a brave warrior in the front lines, who performed many deeds with his magnificent spear. The Hitosuyanagi Kaki is famous for stating that Hideyoshi offered immense praise to both Yoshitsugu and Mitsunari for the battle, stating particularly for Yoshitsugu, "Ōtani Keimatsu was the participant who was excellent since the first move." However, this statement does not appear in other historical texts, so it is possible the quote is entirely fictional.

What is known for sure about Yoshitsugu's service was that he was named Gyōbu-shōyū (a minor Minister of Justice) in 1585. By then, Yoshitsugu was said to have been accepted as one of the elites within Hideyoshi's inner circle. 

According to the Uno Mondo Nikki, a document written as secretary records for Kennyo, Yoshitsugu and Mitsunari were among the men who accompanied Hideyoshi to Arima Onsen in September 1585 and soaked in the same pool as him. During this time, Yoshitsugu has been said to have become ill with a serious disease. There is a particularly famous tale as to why he could have been afflicted with any ailment. 

In 1586, as he stayed within Osaka, a riot ensued and Yoshitsugu went to quell it personally. He slew 1,000 men to Hideyoshi's pleasure, but the gore that splattered on him led to an infection. The Uno Mondo Nikki and Tamon-In Nikki, said to be the diary of the monk Eishūn, state a milder version of Yoshitsugu being ill. They report rumors of Yoshitsugu searching to receive blood from living beings within the city, a method that was believed to have cured diseases. It has also been said that he was actually sick since Shizugatake, but his symptoms did not become apparent until this time. His illness was not described in detail within historical records, yet people generally believe that he was afflicted with leprosy—due to tales from the Edo Period—or syphilis—alternate explanation due to the involvement of bodily fluids.

From there, Yoshitsugu's history is split into two major accounts. The Saifuku-ji Enkinsei, a supposed historical text currently being critically analyzed for its authenticity, claims Yoshitsugu went with Ishida Mitsunari to Kyūshū Campaign in 1587 and helped him lead 12,000 troops without any major difficulties. As a reward, Yoshitsugu was given 50,000 koku and became the lord of Tsuruga Castle. Becoming the local magistrate, he divided 10,000 koku among the territory of the Toyotomi vassals within his region. 

In 1590, He went with Mitsunari to Odawara campaign and also been present at Oshi Castle, though details of his activities for both conflicts are not clearly listed. When Hideyoshi ordered another suppression of Kii Province, Yoshitsugu was one of the men who participated and caused Akita Sanesue's defeat. He has also been accredited to following Mitsunari through various riots, was a part of creating Fushimi Castle as a fort, and took part in the Korean Campaign (1592-1598).

Yoshitsugu returned as a celebrated hero from Korea and was welcomed by Hideyoshi within Osaka Castle. He was invited to share tea with Hideyoshi at a banquet. As the festivities between the two lengthen, Yoshitsugu's nasal mucus accidentally leaked into his tea bowl. Yoshitsugu was about to leave in embarrassment until Hideyoshi noticed him. Expressing that his throat was parched, he asked Yoshitsugu to hand him the same tea bowl with the snot. When it was given to him, Hideyoshi stated that the liquid would be exquisite from his vassal's capable hands and drank it as though nothing were wrong with it. Crying for the first time in his adult life, Yoshitsugu henceforth swore loyalty to the Toyotomi family in gratitude.

The not-as-popular yet reasonable secondary account depicts Yoshitsugu bedridden by his illness. The Rokuon-In Chiroku, said to be the diary of the head monk of Kinkaku-ji during this period, states his illness had advanced into its serious stages and Yoshitsugu had not left the immediate area of his residence in five or six years. His body was unable to endure hard travel, meaning that he couldn't sail overseas or take part in heavy campaigns. In spite of what the former account states, he did not attend in the post Korean Campaign festivities, such as the Daigo Flower Viewing, due to his weakened state. He has been reported to have left his home once in 1598 to celebrate Hideyori's introduction to the court and was given snacks for his illness by a frail Hideyoshi.

Battle of Sekigahara

Following Hideyoshi's death, Yoshitsugu planned to ally himself with Tokugawa Ieyasu in the Ietada Nikki. In 1599, Yoshitsugu gathered his men and moved with the Tokugawa troops as far as Tarui Castle. According to the Keicho Kenmonshu, Mitsunari was at Sawayama Castle and invited Yoshitsugu to his realm. Though blind due to his illness as he entered the gates, Yoshitsugu was appalled to find armed soldiers awaiting him and developed a silent grudge toward Mitsunari. Undeterred, Mitsunari introduced him to his vassal, Shima Kiyooki. Kiyooki flipped Yoshitsugu's perceptions of the Western army, but he wanted to remain within Ieyasu's ranks as he believed Mitsunari could not win. However, for one reason or another, Mitsunari was able to convince Yoshitsugu to defect and join the Western army. A legend states that Ieyasu was aware of Yoshitsugu's talents and was prepared to offer 12,000 koku to have his services. Hearing Yoshitsugu's sudden change of allegiance genuinely surprised him.

As for why Yoshitsugu changed his mind, the reasons remain an enigma to this day. No one really knows why Yoshitsugu did it since little is recorded for it. There are many tales made for why he could have, but they lack any real backing due to the absence of historical evidence. The popular scenario was developed during the Edo Period, stating he joined out of friendship. In this interpretation, Yoshitsugu was only thinking of joining Ieyasu and was asked three times by Mitsunari to join him. Although Yoshitsugu knew it was a failing cause, he couldn't abandon his ties for his friend and merged his forces into the Western army with his sons. Yet another story states Sanada Masayuki's wife was being held hostage by the Western army. Tied to the Sanada family due to his daughter's marriage, he was forced into the hands of the opposition for her safety. Another fable depicts that he conflicted with Ukita Hideie and was joining Ieyasu just to avoid him. Mitsunari heard of this and played mediator between the two parties, eventually convincing Yoshitsugu to stay. 
Whatever the reason, Yoshitsugu fought for the Toyotomi family thenceforth. He was rumored to have misinformed Maeda Toshinaga of the dangers of Asainawate, leading to the battle with the defending Niwa Nagashige (this has been speculated to also be another falsehood tied with him however). 

His other activities before the Battle of Sekigahara are not clearly known, but he was said to have suggested Mitsunari to relocate his main base the night before the conflict. Yoshitsugu led an army of 5,000 for the battle, he was command 600 troops and had three subordinates: Hitatsuka Tamehiro with 900 troops, his son, Ōtani Yoshikatsu, with approximately 2,500, and Kinoshita Yoritsugu with 1,000. Other daimyo under command of Yoshitsugu: Toda Katsushige with 1,500 troops.

According to the Sekigahara Gunki Taisei, Yoshitsugu was aware of Kobayakawa Hideaki's plans for treason yet was powerless to stop it from happening. Repositioning his army to keep an eye on Kobayakawa's movements, he allegedly did so as he did not want his allies to suffer too much from the predicted betrayal. 
Once the Kobayakawa army of 15,000 charged down the mountain towards the West, Yoshitsugu's army stood as the shield to their advance. Armed with a capable army of elites, it would seem that Yoshitsugu had the upper hand for the first clash (the Kobayakawa army had 370 dead or wounded while the Ōtani suffered 180 or so losses), however he was already engaging with eastern forces under the command of Tōdō Takatora when Kobayakawa charged. Tōdō Takatora's army lashed at Yoshitsugu's flank. 
The Ietada Nikki records Kiyooki's fourth son, Shima Kiyomasa, within Yoshitsugu's ranks and he tried to kill Takatora in one blow. However, Kiyomasa was struck down and killed by an Eastern general named Takagi Heizaburō. Kiyomasa's fate echoed the situation of the Ōtani flanks as their defenses crippled from all sides due to the overwhelming numbers. Utterly defeated, Yoshitsugu lost his ground and is said to have committed suicide. Assuming that he was known as Yoshitaka, a grave marker was placed for him at Sekigahara.

There are two famous accounts of his final moments, though they are both deemed questionable in their authenticity. In the Keicho Nenjuki, Yoshitsugu was not able to move of his own power and gave his orders to his subordinates through a palanquin. As the battle with Kobayakawa continued, he instructed his nearby retainer, Yuasa Gosuke, to inform him when the battle was lost. Many times did the cries for defeat echo throughout Yoshitsugu's camp, yet Gosuke continued to insist that the tides could still change. Once Gosuke admitted they were headed for defeat, Yoshitsugu popped his body half way out of his vehicle and sliced off his own head. Gosuke had promised his lord earlier that he would hide his lord's head so it would not be discovered by the enemy, yet he died in battle while attempting to flee from Takatora's army. The same book also reasons that Yoshitsugu had propped himself on horseback and ordered to be sliced at his torso once Gosuke gave the word.

The other story has its roots during the mountain of folklore developed in the Edo Period. Tamehiro was the one to report back with the ill news to Yoshitsugu and was sorely regretful for not being able to stop Kobayakawa. In his remorse, he sang a poem to encourage his lord to commit suicide, roughly translated as, "that I might abandon thy life for thy name, to meet thy sudden end of the world so ruefully". Yoshitsugu appreciated the loyalty behind Tamehiro's words and replied with his own poem, "May we pledge to the Six Paths, and wait for but awhile, to reunite once again on the life ahead." As his reply was sent, Tamehiro did not get to read it as he had already been killed by Kobayakawa soldiers. Turning to Gosuke when ready for his own death, Yoshitsugu asked his retainer to assist him and to hide his head from their enemy. While still in his palanquin, Yoshitsugu stabbed his stomach into a cross spear and his head was chopped off by Gosuke. Gosuke was said to have ordered for his lord's head to be buried in secret before rushing to his own death against the Eastern army.

Grave

The attached photo of his grave shows Gosuke's grave on the left and two steps back from Yoshitsugu's and guarding Yoshitsugu even in the after life. On the right of Yoshitsugu's grave is that of Otani Yoshitaka, possibly another name of his son Yoshikatsu who fought in the Battle of Sekigahara and also committed suicide because of losing to Ieyasu's forces. (The writing on the stone memorials in the photograph identifies the grave of Yuasa Gosuke and Otani Yoshitaka. Although no name can be detected on the central stone monument, it is assumed to be that of Yoshitsugu because it is front and center and reflective of the relationship between Yoshitsugu and two others). 
A radical variation of Gosuke protecting Yoshitsugu's head from detection is also known; in this version, he decapitates himself to divert attention to his master's remains.

Regardless of whether he was a hero or not, Yoshitsugu continues to be celebrated for his samurai spirit and loyalty to his duties. His tragic end against monstrous odds is one of the many popular tales of Sekigahara.

In fiction
*Yoshitsugu is one of the Western army's units in the strategy video game Kessen.
Yoshitsugu is the inspiration for the fictional Lord Onoshi in James Clavell's novel Shōgun.
Yoshitsugu becomes playable character in Samurai Warriors 4, using saihai as weapon. This incarnation is portrayed as an Azai retainer as well as being a close friend of Todo Takatora before Sekigahara. Unlike most incarnations, Yoshitsugu is able to walk and run on his own though he hides his face and most of his body.
In Sengoku Collection, Yoshitsugu is a girl plagued with bad luck, often spending her evenings alone searching for four-leaved clovers.
Yoshitsugu also appears in Sengoku Basara 3 as a cryptic strategist of the Western Army. He is also Motonari's retainer as well as Mitsunari's voice of reason. His goal in the game is to cause all of the other warriors to suffer as much as he has.
Yoshitsugu also features in the fictional game Nioh, as a general commanding forces against Kobayakawa Hideaki. In the battle of Sekigahara, he is shown as a samurai hidden behind a white hood which covers his face, aside from his eyes. This version of Yoshitsugu is not blind and is armed with daishō (dual katanas). After Kobayakawa's betrayal, he uses the magic of antagonist Kelley to transform into a demon and fight on the front lines of the battle. He is later defeated in a one on one fight with main protagonist William, one of the factors leading in Ishida's defeat.

References

Attribution
 

Samurai
1558 births
1600 deaths
Japanese warriors killed in battle
Suicides by seppuku
Daimyo
 Ōtani clan
Toyotomi retainers